James Whipper II, better known by his stage name Prince Whipper Whip, is an American hip hop recording artist. He is of Puerto Rican descent and an original member of Grandwizard Theodore & the Fantastic Five.

Whipper Whip appears in the music video for Ice-T's 1988 hit "High Rollers" and has guest appearances on records by The Beatnuts, Brother Ali, De La Soul, DJ Z-Trip, O.G.Funk Billy Bass Nelson & the Funkadelicks. Can I get a soul clap Fantastic Five, Wild Style Fantastic Five. Sabrosisimo, la vida, Tenemo Ritmo, Down by law with Kid Frost. This is hip hop, Respect with Charlie Chase & Breaking Bread records. 
Tuff city and Grand Master Caz.
Round by Round Grand Master Mele Mel & M C B .

Personal life
He has four children James Whipper III, Joshua Whipper, Sarah Whipper and Grace Whipper.

References

Living people
East Coast hip hop musicians
Rappers from the Bronx
Puerto Rican rappers
Hispanic and Latino American rappers
American people of Puerto Rican descent
21st-century American rappers
Year of birth missing (living people)